The Dollarton Bridge comprises a pair of two-lane reinforced concrete spans the Seymour River in North Vancouver, British Columbia, Canada. It replaced a two-lane steel truss bridge built in 1948. It is 153 meters (501 feet) long.

The bridge, which is part of the Dollarton Highway, provides 4 lanes of road traffic and two 3 metre wide pedestrian-bicycle sidewalks.

See also 
 List of bridges in Canada

External links 
District of North Vancouver Dollarton Bridge Replacement Project

Bridges completed in 2005
Bridges in Greater Vancouver
Transport in North Vancouver (district municipality)
Road bridges in British Columbia